was a private junior college in Shinagawa, Tokyo, Japan.

History 
The college opened in April 1950, but the predecessor of the school was founded in 1880. It closed on December 19, 2008.

Courses offered 
It offered courses in civil engineering.

See also 
 List of junior colleges in Japan

References

External links 
 Gogyokusha Gakuen website 

Educational institutions established in 1950
Japanese junior colleges
1950 establishments in Japan
Universities and colleges in Tokyo
Private universities and colleges in Japan
2008 disestablishments in Japan